Yersinia thracica is a Gram-negative species of enteric bacteria in the Yersinia genus that is closely related to Yersinia kristensenii. Reportedly, it has only been isolated in animals. The type strain, IP34646T, was isolated from diseased rainbow trout while other isolates are from birds, pig feces, and wild boars.

References

External links
LSPN lpsn.dsmz.de
Type strain of Yersinia thracica at BacDive -  the Bacterial Diversity Metadatabase

thracica
Bacteria described in 2020